Ridgley is an unincorporated community in Barry County, in the U.S. state of Missouri.

History
A post office called Ridgley was established in 1909, and remained in operation until 1919. The community's lofty elevation atop a ridge accounts for the name.

References

Unincorporated communities in Barry County, Missouri
Unincorporated communities in Missouri